FC Solli Plyus Kharkiv is an amateur club from Kharkiv competing at the regional competitions of Kharkiv Oblast. 

The club originally was founded in 1966 as Elektrotyazhmash Kharkiv at the Eletrotyazhmash Factory but eventually the team was dissolved. In 2010 it was revived again.

In 2016 the club lost its original sponsor and was bought by another company Solli+. The club renamed as FC Solli Plyus Kharkiv.

Honours
Ukrainian football championship among amateurs

Football championship of Kharkiv Oblast
 Winners (1): 2016
 Runners-up (0):

Holder of the Kharkiv Oblast Football Cup
 Winners (0):

References

External links
 Official website

 
Amateur football clubs in Ukraine
Football clubs in Kharkiv